NATO Defense College  (NDC) is the international  military  college for North Atlantic Treaty Organization countries.  It is located in Rome, Italy.

History

The idea of a NATO Defense College originated with General Dwight D. Eisenhower, the first Supreme Allied Commander Europe, who identified very early on the need for a new international institution with a unique education mission. On 19 November 1951, the NATO Defense College opened its doors to Course 1 in Paris. In 1966, France withdrew from the Alliance's integrated military structure and the College moved to the EUR quartier of Rome, where it continues to fulfil its mission. On 10 September 1999, the new College building, twice the size of the old one, was inaugurated in Cecchignola Città Militare, a military zone 2 km from the former site. On 13–14 October 2016, the NATO Defense College celebrated the 50th anniversary of its move to Rome and the 65th anniversary of its foundation.

Mission
In response to Strategic Guidance issued to the NDC by the North Atlantic Council and the NATO Military Committee (MC123/8), the NDC Mission is:

 Contribute to effectiveness and cohesion of Alliance 
 Foster strategic level thinking on pol-mil matters 
 Develop major center of education, study, and research: 
 Prepare selected officers and officials for important NATO and NATO-related multinational appointments 
 Conduct academic studies and research in support of the Alliance's wider goals 
 Support an active outreach programme with other educational institutions

Organization

The commandant is an officer with the rank of Lieutenant-General; on 16 July 2019 Lieutenant-General Olivier Rittimann (French Army) assumed command.

To accomplish its mission the college is organized into four main divisions that perform education and research tasks coordinated by the dean (civilian equivalent of a 2-star general) of the college.

The divisions work closely together to provide breadth, flexibility and quality of high-level strategic education.

The Director of Management (a Brigadier General) supervises management of the NDC's financial and technical resources with the aim of improving the quality of life in the college and creating the best conditions for work and study.

Core business

Education 

Six regular courses are held at the college:
The Senior Course: The most important course at the NDC. It lasts 5½ months and runs twice a year. Some 15 weeks are spent in the college, with the rest of the time on Field Studies. There is a 2-3 day crisis management exercise at the end of the Course. The Course is open to officers (Colonels, Lieutenant Colonels) and civilian officials and diplomats (of equivalent rank). Over 200 attend each year (approximately 25% civilian). The Senior Course is open not only to NATO nations but also to Partnership for Peace-Mediterranean Dialogue-Istanbul Cooperation Initiative nations, Contact Countries and Iraq.
Generals, Flag Officers & Ambassadors' Course (GFOAC): This high-level course seeks to enhance mutual understanding of security concerns and of NATO's interests and capabilities among Generals and Flag Officers and high-ranking civilians including ambassadors from NATO, PfP, Med Dialogue and ICI nations, Contact Countries & Iraq. It also provides opportunities for networking among one- to three-star officers and civilians of equivalent rank.
NATO Regional Cooperation Course (NRCC):  Commissioned by the North Atlantic Council at the Riga summit in 2006, after two years of preparation the NRCC was inaugurated at the College in 2009 to link issues of concern to both MD and ICI Nations and NATO, and to develop mutual understanding and networking among participants. It shares lecturers with the Senior Course (40% of the time), and also has its own separate facilities and lecturers, mostly from the ME region, and its own Faculty Advisors and staff. The NRCC offers a ten-week academic programme twice each year.
Modular Short Courses (MSCs): The NDC offers five MSCs during every Senior Course for the duration 5 days. This is an opportunity for military officers and civilian officials who may not be able to attend the NDC for a six-month period. Each MSC is designed to both inform and stimulate the participants by providing the opportunity to improve their knowledge and develop their understanding of some of the key political, economic, socio-cultural, defence and security related issues which may have worldwide implications for global and Alliance security.
Senior Executive Regional Conference (SERC): This week-long conference is dedicated to a select, high-profile group of diplomats, senior officials, high-ranking officers, policy planners and researchers, from NATO member states as well as from the Alliance's partner countries in the Gulf and Mediterranean area. Participants successfully engaged in an intensive week of study, dialogue and open discussion on the strategic issues which are currently of particular relevance to the security of the countries represented.
Integrated Partner Orientation Course (IPOC): The aim of the Integrated Partner Orientation Course (IPOC) is to improve participants' knowledge of the NATO Alliance; its missions, roles and priorities; its internal structures and organisation; and its external relations with partner nations and international institutions. The course examines the way in which each of these elements is evolving to reflect changes in the international security environment, which is similar to the structure of the NDC Senior Course.

Research

Research at the NATO Defense College, carried out by the Research Division (RD), provides the NATO's senior leaders with timely analyses and recommendations on current issues concerning the Alliance. The activities of the RD can help to convey NATO's positions to the wider audience of the international strategic community. The RD performs its tasks mainly through research papers – short academic essays and academic reports, and forum papers – in-depth studies, analyses and reports.

Over the last year, the Research Division published about 20 studies and analyses, about 30 articles in journals (International Herald Tribune, International Affairs, Defense News, Politique Étrangère, Washington Times, etc.), was regularly quoted in the New York Times, Newsweek, Le Figaro and news agencies, etc. The RD also organized 8 conferences and workshops and co-facilitated Reykjavik Conferences on Arctic Security and a Military Committee workshop on the Strategic Concept.

Outreach activities

The NDC has four main outreach activities:

The Conference of Commandants (of Defence Colleges)
Which has a dual purpose. 
firstly, to facilitate the exchange of information between those responsible for higher defence education with a view to improving curricula and teaching methods; 
secondly, to promote cooperation in higher defence education between colleges in NATO countries and their counterparts in central and east European and Mediterranean Dialogue countries.

Kyiv Week

NATO's support for senior military education in Ukraine started with the first "International Week", held in February 2001. Since then a similar course has been running every year involving more than 500 participants at a time.
The formal aims of the International Week are: 
to improve knowledge of NATO, its organization and working methods; 
to discuss the challenges facing the Atlantic Alliance and its partners in today's security environment; 
to address key, current issues in the field of international security; *to demonstrate the importance of a strong partnership between Ukraine and NATO.

The Partnership for Peace Consortium of Defense Academies and Security Studies Institutes

Was established in 1999 at the Washington Summit as a Consortium of the Willing and founded in the spirit of Partnership for Peace (PfP). By Military Committee direction, the NATO Defense College "is the focal military point of contact within NATO" for the consortium, composed of 300 organizations in 46 countries. The NDC is actively involved in 6 of the 10 working groups.

Advanced Distributed Learning

ADL's goal is to provide learning systems that are both more effective and more cost-effective. Course members must follow at least one of the three different ADL courses, to ensure that they have all attained the same level of knowledge before embarking on the Senior Course.

The Introduction to NATO (the NATO Defense College is the content provider for this course); European Security and Defence Policy, and RMA - the Revolution in Military Affairs.

Commandants
The NATO Defense College commandants have been:

1951-1953 - Admiral André-Georges Lemonnier (French Navy)
1953-1955 - Air Marshal Sir Lawrence Darvall (Royal Air Force)
1955-1957 - Lieutenant General Clovis E. Byers (U.S. Army)
1957-1958 - Lieutenant General E. De Renzi (Italian Army)
1958 - Major General E.N.K. Estcourt (British Army) - Acting Commandant
1958-1959 - Air Lieutenant General Tekin Arıburun (Turkish Air Force)
1959-1961 - Lieutenant General O. Harteon (Belgian Army)
1961-1963 - Lieutenant General U. De Martino (Italian Army)
1963-1965 - Lieutenant General Wolf Graf Von Baudissin (German Army)
1965-1966 - Lieutenant General D.S. Fanali (Italian Air Force)
1966-1968 - Lieutenant General E. Tufte Johnsen (Royal Norwegian Air Force)
1968-1970 - Lieutenant General  (Turkish Army)
1970-1974 - Vice Admiral J.E. O'Brien (Canadian Forces (Maritime))
1974-1976 - Lieutenant General  (Danish Army)
1976-1979 - Lieutenant General R.J.W. Heslinga (Royal Netherlands Army)
1979-1981 - Vice Admiral Sir Lancelot Bell-Davies (Royal Navy)
1981-1984 - Lieutenant General J.G. Kotsolakis (Greek Air Force)
1984-1987 - Lieutenant General F.l.S. Uhle-Wettler (German Army)
1987-1989 - Lieutenant General A. Everaert (Belgian Army)
1989-1993 - Lieutenant General P.M.A. Castelo Branco (Portuguese Air Force)
1993-1996 - Lieutenant General R.J. Evraire (Canadian Forces (Land))
1996-1999 - Lieutenant General Lecea Dezcallar (Spanish Army)
1999-2002 - Lieutenant General H. Olboeter (German Air Force)
2002-2005 - Lieutenant General J.P. Raffene (French Army)
2005-2008 - Lieutenant General M. Vankeirsbilck (Belgian Air Component)
2008-2011 - Lieutenant General Wolf-Dieter Loeser (German Army)
2011-2014 - Lieutenant General Arne Bård Dalhaug (Norwegian Army)
2014-2016 - Major General Janusz Bojarski (Polish Air Force)
2016–2020 - Lieutenant General Chris Whitecross (Royal Canadian Air Force)
2020–present - Lieutenant General Olivier Rittimann (French Army)

See also
European Security and Defence College
Joint European Union Intelligence School
Military Erasmus
NATO School

References

External links 
 NATO Defense College

 
Educational institutions established in 1951
Universities and colleges in Rome
Military schools
1951 establishments in Italy